Luka Tankulic (born 21 June 1991) is a German professional footballer who plays as a striker for German club SV Meppen.

Club career
Tankulic began his career with Ahlener SG and was later scouted by city rival LR Ahlen. After three years with the club he signed with Borussia Dortmund in summer 2005. After two years with Borussia he signed with Rot-Weiss Ahlen, where he played his debut match in the DFB Cup on 22 September 2009 leading to a contract with the club, signed on 6 October 2009, which runs through 30 June 2012.

On 15 July 2014, after Tankulic appeared as a trialist for Dundee F.C. in their pre-season fixture against Manchester City and scored in a 2–0 win, manager Paul Hartley expressed a desire to offer the player a contract. Tankulic and his compatriot Thomas Konrad subsequently signed two-year contracts with Dundee in July 2014. He scored on his debut as Dundee won 4–0 against Peterhead on 2 August 2014, in the Scottish League Cup. On 28 August 2015, Tankulic left Dundee, with his contract being terminated by mutual consent.

In February 2016, Tankulic signed for Regionalliga West club Sportfreunde Lotte.

References

External links
 
 

1991 births
Living people
People from Ahlen
Sportspeople from Münster (region)
German people of Croatian descent
German footballers
Footballers from North Rhine-Westphalia
Association football forwards
Scottish Professional Football League players
2. Bundesliga players
3. Liga players
Regionalliga players
Rot Weiss Ahlen players
Borussia Dortmund players
Fortuna Düsseldorf II players
1. FSV Mainz 05 II players
VfL Wolfsburg II players
Dundee F.C. players
Sportfreunde Lotte players
SV Meppen players
German expatriate footballers
German expatriate sportspeople in Scotland
Expatriate footballers in Scotland